The Chattooga County School District is a public school district in Chattooga County, Georgia, United States, based in Summerville. It serves the communities of Lyerly, Menlo, Summerville, and Trion.

Beginning in the 2010-2011 school year the district began holding school for four days per week instead of five. As a result, each school day is longer. The district saved $800,000 in its first year of four-day-per-week operations. In 2019, the school district ended their four-day school week policy, due to the school district's low test scores.

Schools
The Chattooga County School District has four elementary schools, one middle school, and one high school.

Elementary schools 
Leroy Massey Elementary School
Lyerly Elementary School
Menlo Elementary School
Summerville Elementary School

Middle school
Summerville Middle School

High school
Chattooga High School

References

External links
 

School districts in Georgia (U.S. state)
Education in Chattooga County, Georgia